Jemmapes was a  74-gun ship of the line of the French Navy.

Laid down as Alexandre, she was renamed Jemmapes on 7 January 1793 in honour of the Battle of Jemappes. She took part in the Atlantic campaign of May 1794 and ultimately in the Glorious First of June.

She took part in the expedition to Saint-Domingue under Julien Cosmao.

She was part of Zacharie Allemand's "invisible squadron", under Captain Jean-Nicolas Petit. She fought at the Battle of the Basque Roads in 1809.

She was used as a hulk in Rochefort, Charente-Maritime from 1830, and was later broken up.

Notes, citations, and references

Notes

Citations

References

Ships of the line of the French Navy
Téméraire-class ships of the line
1794 ships
Ships built in France